Prince Faisal Stadium is a multi-purpose stadium in Al Karak, Jordan. It is currently used mostly for football matches. The stadium holds 7,000 people.

External links

Football venues in Jordan
Multi-purpose stadiums in Jordan